Xinzhou may refer to the following locations in China:

Xinzhou, prefecture-level city in northern Shanxi

Districts
 Xinzhou District, Shangrao, Jiangxi
 Xinzhou District, Wuhan, Hubei

Town
 Xinzhou, Jinshi (新洲镇), a town in Jinshi City, Hunan Province.

Other place
An historical name for Yunnanyi, Yunnan